Damien M. Corsetti was a soldier in the United States Army.  
As part of the Army's investigation into prisoner abuse at Bagram, Corsetti was charged with dereliction of duty, maltreatment, assault and performing an indecent act with another person. PFC Corsetti was later found not guilty of all charges.
At the time Corsetti was a specialist in the 519th Military Intelligence Battalion, serving under Lieutenant Carolyn Wood.

On May 20, 2005, Tim Golden of The New York Times published a long article on the Bagram murders based on a 2,000-page classified report to which The Times had gotten access.  
This article contained many allegations about Corsetti's role.

According to The New York Times:
 One of Corsetti's nickname in the unit was "Monster".  He had a tattoo across his stomach of the Italian word for Monster.
 Another of Corsetti's nicknames in the unit was "The King of Torture".  Corsetti was large and imposing, and was called upon by other interrogators to frighten prisoners using the interrogation technique known as "Fear up, harsh".
 According to one detainee Corsetti's abuse of prisoners included poking bound prisoners in the face with his naked penis and threatening them with sexual assault.
 During his posting to Abu Ghraib Corsetti and two other soldiers were reprimanded.

Corsetti was charged on October 6, 2005. According to the National Catholic Reporter, Corsetti's lawyer said:
“The president of the United States doesn’t know what the rules are. The secretary of defense doesn’t know what the rules are. But the government expects this Pfc. to know what the rules are?"

Corsetti's court martial commenced on May 30, 2006.
Guantanamo detainee Ahmed al-Darbi, a brother-in-law of a 9/11 hijacker, claimed to be a victim of Corsetti's abuse, and was able to describe Corsetti's tattoos in detail.

On 1 June 2006, a military jury found PFC Corsetti not guilty of all charges.

The September 14, 2006 issue of The Boston Globe contained an Op-ed from Moazzam Begg, who described his contact with Corsetti.
Begg described being approached by Corsetti's defense attorneys, to serve as a defense witness.  Begg described Corsetti as a friend, who gave him a copy of the classic anti-war novel Catch-22.
Begg said that Corsetti never abused him, and would stop for friendly conversations with inmates including Omar Khadr, and that he was one of the friendly GIs who had helped him endure his imprisonment.

However, Begg expressed the opinion that while Corsetti's superiors deserved a heavy load of responsibility for the abuses at Bagram and Abu Ghraib, low level soldiers like his friend Corsetti couldn't escape all responsibility if they committed illegal acts.

On 2 October 2006, PFC Corsetti was honorably discharged from the United States Army.

Corsetti consented to appear at a December 5, 2007 preview screening for the film Taxi to the Dark Side, that is critical of the "War on Terrorism".

Corsetti's war experience has been summarized by the Spanish journalist Pablo Pardo in the book El Monstruo ('The Monster'), published in Spain on September 12, 2011.

See also
Torture
Dilawar   
Habibullah   
Glendale C. Walls   
Selena M. Salcedo   
Joshua Claus

References

External links
 Former US interrogator Damien Corsetti recalls the torture of prisoners in Bagram and Abu Ghraib

Living people
United States Army soldiers
Year of birth missing (living people)
United States Army personnel who were court-martialed